Bijan Gloston is an American-born Guamanian footballer who plays as a goalkeeper for Marshall Thundering Herd and the Guam national team.

References

External links
 

1993 births
Living people
American soccer players
Guamanian footballers
Guam international footballers
Marshall Thundering Herd men's soccer players
West Virginia Chaos players
Association football goalkeepers
Soccer players from Tennessee
USL League Two players